Kyle Vinales (born June 18, 1992) is an American basketball player for Legia Warszawa of the Polish Basketball League. He previously competed for the Central Connecticut Blue Devils men's basketball team. He announced that he would not transfer following the 2012–13 NCAA Division I men's basketball season despite the high possibility due to CCSU's lack of success in basketball. Vinales is one of the highest scorers in Division I college basketball and most notably averaged 21.6 points in his successful sophomore season.

High school career 
Vinales began playing basketball with The Phelps School in Malvern, Pennsylvania. Under head coach Brian Shanahan, he emerged as a pure scorer with a diverse attacking game. However, the combo guard would later move to North Farmington High School and start playing with coach Tom Negoshian. He spent his sophomore, junior, and senior seasons at Farmington Hills. In his last year with North Farmington, Vinales averaged about 25.7 points per game. Some of his greatest honors in high school include All-Oakland County and Second Team All-State.

Collegiate career 
Before committing to Central Connecticut State University, Vinales was rated as a one-star recruit by ESPN Recruiting Nation Basketball with a scout grade of 78. He officially signed with the team on November 8, 2010.

Vinales made an excellent career debut after scoring 24 points and recording 5 steals in a loss against Yale on November 11, 2011. He would score a season-high 39 points in his second game against Niagara. Due to his performances, Vinales was named Northeast Conference Rookie of the Week on several occasions, but never earned more prestigious honors.

In his sophomore season at CCSU, Vinales became known as one of the top scorers in the NCAA. He averaged the seventh-most points in the Division I and became the quickest player in school history to reach the 1,000 point ceiling. Vinales was named NEC Player of the Week during the season, and was also named the conference's Rookie of the Year, making the All-Rookie Team as well. Following the season, Vinales made the decision to return to Central Connecticut despite the strong possibility of the transfer.

In his third year playing basketball for CCSU, Vinales continued to be one of the most aggressive scorers in the NCAA. However, in January 2014, Vinales injured his shooting hand during practice. Howie Dickenman, the team's head coach, made the statement, "You hate to see it happen to someone who works so hard."

Kyle never played in his senior year. He announced that he would not be playing via Twitter, saying "No more college ball for me. Time to start my pro career" after he was arrested in October 2014 for allegedly assaulting his girlfriend. He ended his career with 1,514 points and hopes to play in the NBA. However, he was later signed by the Puerto Rican team Vaqueros de Bayamon for the 2015 season.

Professional career 
In 2015 Vinales won the Tunisian league MVP when he averages 22.4 point and 6 assist per game. He also won the Tunisian league championship in the same year. In 2018 he was named to the BSN (Puerto Rican league) top five players. When he averaged 20.1 pts per game 3.4 rebs and 3.6 assist for Humacao Caciques.

On September 30, 2019, he has signed with Kalev/Cramo of the Latvian–Estonian League.

On July 12, 2020, he has signed with Lietkabelis of the Lithuanian Basketball League. Vinales played for Gigantes de Carolina of the Puerto Rican league in 2021, averaging 11.2 points, 5.0 assists, and 3.4 rebounds per game. On September 7, 2021, he signed with KK Studentski centar of the Prva A Liga and the ABA League.

In Februaray, 2022, he signed with Mets de Guaynabo of the Puerto Rican League.

On July 4, 2022, he has signed with SLUC Nancy Basket of the LNB Pro A.

On January 1, 2023, he signed with Legia Warszawa of the Polish Basketball League.

The Basketball Tournament
Vinales joined House of 'Paign, a team composed primarily of Illinois alumni in The Basketball Tournament 2020. He scored five points and dished out four assists in a 76-53 win over War Tampa in the first round.

References 

1992 births
Living people
ABA League players
AEK Larnaca B.C. players
American expatriate basketball people in Cyprus
American expatriate basketball people in Estonia
American expatriate basketball people in Montenegro
American men's basketball players
Basketball players from Detroit
BC Kalev/Cramo players
BC Lietkabelis players
Caciques de Humacao players
Central Connecticut Blue Devils men's basketball players
Club Africain basketball players
KK Studentski centar players
Legia Warsaw (basketball) players
Point guards
Shooting guards
SLUC Nancy Basket players
Vaqueros de Bayamón players